The Brak River is a river located in northern Limpopo Province, South Africa. It is a tributary of the Polokwane River.

Course
The Brak River starts on the east of the Makgabeng Plateau and flows north-northeast until reaching the Blouberg, skirting the massif and flowing diagonally northeastwards between the Blouberg and the Soutpansberg. The Brak River is an intermittent stream.

This river should not be confused with the Great Brak River of the Western Cape.

See also 
Drainage basin A
 List of rivers of South Africa

References

External links
The Anglo-Boer War, 1899-1902 - The Far North-Western Front

Rivers of Limpopo